Cecilia Grubbström (born 2 September 1986) is a former Swedish handball goalkeeper. She has played on the Swedish national team. She competed at the 2010 European Women's Handball Championship where the Swedish team placed second, and Grubbström was listed among the top ten goalkeepers of the championship.

References

Living people
Swedish female handball players
Handball players at the 2012 Summer Olympics
Viborg HK players
1986 births
Olympic handball players of Sweden